The Muda Institute is an arts school in the center of Evergem, Belgium.

There are two options : dance and music. Dance contains ballet, modern dance, jazz and more. Music contains solfège, singing, musical, a primary instrument, a secondary instrument and more. One of the two instruments should be piano, organ, harpsichord or accordion.

Normally the school gives up to ten performances in a year: a student concert, a concert on the open door day, an evaluated concert of the 6th year, and some other performances.

References

External links
 

Dance schools in Belgium
Music schools in Belgium
Educational institutions with year of establishment missing
Evergem